Taglioni is the surname of:

Alice Taglioni (born 1976), French actress
Fabio Taglioni (1920–2001), Italian engineer
Filippo Taglioni (1777–1871), Italian dancer and choreographer, Marie and Paul's father
Marie Taglioni (1804–1884), Swedish-Italian ballerina
Paul Taglioni (1808–1883), German-Italian ballet master

See also
 Taglioni, a ship arriving in the colony of South Australia in 1844, bringing Christopher Rawson Penfold